Katholische Academische Verbindung (K.A.V.) Lovania Leuven is a Catholic academic fraternity, founded in 1896 at the Catholic University of Louvain in Leuven, Belgium. It is a German Studentenverbindung and is an affiliated member of the Cartellverband der katholischen deutschen Studentenverbindungen.  Her motto is Semper Excelsius! (Der Geist lebt in uns allen!).  Its official coulours (Couleur) are green, white and red.

History 

The Old University of Leuven, founded in 1425, was closed down during the occupation of the Low Countries in 1797 after the French revolutionaries occupied the country. After the defeat of the revolutionaries and Belgian independence from the Netherlands, the Catholic University of Louvain was founded in 1834 and was able to attract quite a number of Catholic students from Germany, Austria and Switzerland who were fleeing the Kulturkampf.

At first a Swiss Catholic student fraternity was founded, Helvetia Lovaniensis. It existed from 1872 to 1875.  It was succeeded by an all German Catholic student fraternity, Tungria Lovaniensis, that existed from 1877 until 1879. In 1888 a regional student fraternity was founded by students from Luxemburg. Only the last fraternity survived. Out of the ashes of the demise of the Swiss and German fraternities, a new fraternity was founded.

During his student years in Bonn, Thiéry had become a member of the prestigious student fraternity K.D.St. V. Bavaria Bonn, the oldest Catholic student fraternity in the world. This speech motivated a number of Germanic students to such an extent that they decided to establish a fraternity that same evening. It was called Lovania, which is Latin for Leuven (Louvain). The fraternity quickly expanded and Prof. Thiéry became honorary president. Lovania continued to blossom until the outbreak of the First World War. In 1914 the fraternity was suspended due to the commencement of fighting. At that moment the fraternity already had more than 160 active and inactive members. Numerous members died on both sides of the war.

In post war Belgium it was impossible to re-establish a German student fraternity in 1918. Promising efforts were made during 1927 and 1928 but failed after a short period of time. The Second World War made a quick re-establishment even more impossible. It took until 1996 until the political situation was stable enough to reconstitute the fraternity, within the Dutch-speaking Katholieke Universiteit te Leuven. At that moment many students who belonged to fraternities were members of the Cartellverband and studied in Louvain.  The idea then arose to re-establish the fraternity. The last surviving member gave his blessing to this undertaking and on April 19, 1996 the reactivation became a reality. In 1999 the friendly affiliation to the Cartellverband was formally re-established.  Today the fraternity flourishes and has 137 members to date, originating from Flanders, the Netherlands, Germany, Austria, Switzerland, Poland, the United Kingdom, Ireland and the United States.

Principles 

Lovania is founded upon three guiding principles:
religio: the fraternity and all its members publicly adhere to the Roman Catholic faith 
scientia: the pursuit of an academic education of all of its members 
amicitia: a lifelong friendship between all the members of the fraternity as long as they live whilst demonstrating a strong esprit de corps

The members of Lovania do not practice academic fencing (Mensur) because it is forbidden by the Roman Catholic Church. Academic fencing is common with the more secular student fraternities that already existed in Germanic countries. Due to this restriction, Catholic students had to organize themselves in separate fraternities. Lovania only accepts men into the organization.

Structures 
The fraternity has a legislative (the power to make laws), executive (the power to implement laws) and judiciary (the power to judge and apply punishment when laws are broken) body. All full members make up the legislative body, which elects the executive body.  The legislative body also functions as a judiciary body. In this case it assumes the function of an honorary senate.

Traditions 

The official dress symbols, that are worn by each member, consist of a vertical green-white-red triband bordered with a golden thread and a green kepi, the historical military cap as worn during the American Civil War.

During official ceremonies and special occasions, the praesidium wears a dress uniform, a traditional Polish military uniform called a Vollwichs which consists mainly of a bekiesza.

Famous members (selection)

Deceased
 Prof. Dr. Prosper Viscount Poullet (December 9, 1871 - December 23, 1935) former prime minister of Belgium and Minister of State
 Pierre Prüm (July 9, 1886 – February 1, 1950) former prime minister of Luxemburg
 Alexander Count von Kolowrat (January 29, 1886 – December 4, 1927) founder of the Austrian movie industry
 Mon De Goeyse (October 1, 1907 - December 21, 1998), Flemish student leader, author of the clubcodex
 Prof. Dr. Albert Carnoy (November 7, 1878 - January 12, 1961), Belgian minister of internal affairs and health 
 Mgr. Charles Cartuyvels (February 27, 1835), vice-rector of the Catholic University of Louvain
 Mr. Georges Baron Holvoet (August 16, 1874 - April 23, 1964), governor of the (Belgian) province of Antwerp and chef de cabinet of the Prince-regent Charles of Belgium
 Paul Lebeau (June 29, 1908 - October 18, 1982) Flemish author
 Prof. Dr. Albert Michotte (1881 - 1965), experimental psychologist
 Prof. Dr. Dr. Dr. Francis Aveling Ph.D. (1875-1941)
 Etienne Baron Orban de Xivry (February 18, 1885 - July 23, 1953), Belgian senator 
 Jef van den Eynde (December 21, 1879 - April 12, 1929), Flemish student leader
 Prof. Dr. Adam van Kan (July 18, 1877 - June 6, 1944), Dutch scientist
 Prof. Dr. Dr. Dr. Ir Can. Armand Thiéry (6. augustus 1868 - 12. januari 1955), priest and founder of the fraternity
 Mr. Charles Baron Woeste (February 26, 1837 - April 5, 1922), Belgian Minister of State

Literature
 Wehr, Florian, Geschichte des CV, 2. Auflage, Berlin, 1900
 Thiéry Armand, Chansonnier des étudiants Belges publié par la Studentenverbindung Lovania, Breitkopf et Härtel, Brüssel, 1901
 Lovania - 10 Jahre deutschsprechenden Studententums in Löwen 1895–1905, Leuven, 1906
 15. Vereinsjahr - Academische Studenten Verbindung Lovania 1895–1910, Leuven, 1910
 Wils J., Les étudiants des régions comprises dans la Nation germanique de l'Université de Louvain, 2, Leuven, 1910
 Katholische Academische Studentenverbindung Lovania - Jahresbericht 1910–1912, Druck. F. Giele, Leuven, 1912
 Wolf Otto, Geschichte der katholischen deutschen Studentenverbindung Bavaria 1844–1914, Bonn, 1914
 Contzen Hans, Lovania - Zwanzig Jahre deutschsprechenden Studententums in Belgien, Studentenbibliothek 24), Mönchengladbach, 1916
 Schulze, Friedrich, Ssymank, Paul, Das deutsche Studententum von den ältesten Zeiten bis zur Gegenwart, 1932, Verlag für Hochschulkunde, München (Nachdruck), 
 Doergé Robert., 75 Jahre katholische deutsche Studentenverbindung Franconia an der Rheinisch-Westfälischen technischen Hochschule Aachen 1898–1973, Aachen, 1974
 de Bruyne, Arthur (Ed.), Bijdragen tot de geschiedenis van een generatie - Een liber amicorum voor mr. Willem Melis, Rinda, 1977, Kemzeke
 de Goeyse Mon., O Vrij-Studentenheerlijkheid, Leuvense Universitaire Pers, Leuven, 1987, 
 Schieweck-Mauk S., Lexikon der CV- und ÖCV-Verbindungen, Gemeinschaft für deutsche Studentengeschichte, Würzburg, 1997, 
 Bodman, Ernst-Michael, 100 Jahre K.D.St.-V. Franconia Aachen, Aachen, 1999
 Uytterhoeven R., Nostalgia Lovaniensis, Universitaire Pers Leuven, Leuven, 2000, 
 Vos Louis, Weets Wilfried, (Ed.), Vlaamse vaandels, rode petten, Uitgeverij Pelckmans, Kapellen, 2002, 
 Hartmann, Gerhard, Für Gott und Vaterland - Geschichte und Wirken des CV in Österreich, Lahn-Verlag, Wien, 2006, 
 Huys, Jan, Van de Weyer Stefan, De studentikoze erfenis van Rodenbach, Acco Drukkerij, Leuven, 2006

External links
 Website of K.A.V. Lovania Leuven
 Historical postcards of K.A.V. Lovania zu Löwen
 Cartellverband der katholischen deutschen Studentenverbindungen

Lovania
Lovania
Student organizations established in 1896
Catholic University of Leuven (1834–1968)
Christian fraternities and sororities in Belgium
Catholic universities and colleges in Belgium
Student religious organisations in Belgium
Student societies in Belgium
1896 establishments in Belgium